The 2012 Gambella bus attack was a shooting incident on 12 March 2012, 12 miles from the town of Gambella in Ethiopia which killed 19 people and wounded 8 others. The victims were Ethiopian residents who were travelling on a public bus, near the town of Obang.

See also
List of terrorist incidents, 2012

References

Attacks in Africa in 2012
Spree shootings in Ethiopia
Mass murder in 2012
Terrorist incidents in Ethiopia
Terrorist incidents in Africa in 2012
Gambela Region
Terrorist incidents on buses in Africa
March 2012 crimes
March 2012 events in Africa
2012 murders in Ethiopia
Terrorist incidents in Ethiopia in the 2000s